Bec School (often referred to as Bec Grammar School) was a boys' grammar school in Tooting, South London, England.

History
It was established in Tooting Bec in 1926.

The school closed when it was amalgamated with the adjacent Hillcroft School in 1971 to create Bec-Hillcroft comprehensive school. Bec-Hillcroft was renamed Ernest Bevin School, after the former Labour minister Ernest Bevin, the next year.

The original Bec School buildings were demolished in 1996 and part of the original school site was used for housing. Ernest Bevin School was renamed Ernest Bevin College in 1997 and occupies part of the former Bec School site. The school is now known as Ernest Bevin Academy.

Alumni

 William Armstrong, Baron Armstrong of Sanderstead, chairman of Midland Bank from 1975–80
 David Davis (British politician), Conservative MP for Haltemprice and Howden
Douglas Day, Queen's Counsel, Recorder of the Crown Court
 Michael Goldacre, Professor of Public Health, Oxford University
 Bob Hiller, former England rugby captain
 Art Malik, actor
 Mike Sarne, singer
 Professor Cedric A. B. Smith, (1929–32), statistician and geneticist
 Jim Findley, actor 
 Robyn Williams, science broadcaster
 Robert Balchin, Baron Lingfield, British educationalist
 Brian Paddick, Baron Paddick, British politician and former London Metropolitan Assistant Deputy Police Commissioner. 
 Reginald Hollingdale, biographer and translator of German philosophy and literature.
 David Mills RA, sculptor.
 Tony McPhee, singer, lead guitarist and founder of The Groundhogs
 Sir Douglas Lovelock KCB (1923-2014), Head of HM Customs and Excise, First Church Estates Commissioner, Chairman of the Whitgift Foundation
 Reginald Bottini CBE, General Secretary of the National Union of Agricultural and Allied Workers from 1970-8
 Steve Dean, mountaineer and writer

References

External links
 Ernest Bevin College website

Educational institutions established in 1926
Defunct grammar schools in England
Defunct schools in the London Borough of Wandsworth
Educational institutions disestablished in 1970
1926 establishments in England
1970 disestablishments in England